The 6th National Congress of the Kuomintang was the sixth national congress of the Kuomintang, held on 5 May 1945 at Chungking, Republic of China. This congress saw the first participation of Taiwan Province in the congress, represented by Hsieh Tung-min, despite Taiwan being under Japanese rule.

Results
The congress outlined keynotes for national reconstruction and constitutional matters after the Pacific War. It also established the framework for a democratic government.

See also
 Kuomintang

References

1945 conferences
1945 in China
May 1945 events in Asia
National Congresses of the Kuomintang
Politics of the Republic of China (1912–1949)